Penrod is an unincorporated community in Muhlenberg County, Kentucky, United States.

History
A post office called Penrod was established in 1885, and remained in operation until 1994. H. C. Penrod, an early postmaster, gave the community his name.

References

Unincorporated communities in Muhlenberg County, Kentucky
Unincorporated communities in Kentucky